In mathematics and mathematical physics, a factorization algebra is an algebraic structure first introduced by Beilinson and Drinfel'd in an algebro-geometric setting as a reformulation of chiral algebras, and also studied in a more general setting by Costello to study quantum field theory.

Definition

Prefactorization algebras 
A factorization algebra is a prefactorization algebra satisfying some properties, similar to sheafs being a presheaf with extra conditions.

 For each inclusion , there's a linear map  
 There is a linear map  for each finite collection of open sets with each  and the  pairwise disjoint.

So  resembles a precosheaf, except the vector spaces are tensored rather than (direct-)summed.

The category of vector spaces can be replaced with any symmetric monoidal category.

Factorization algebras 
To define factorization algebras, it is necessary to define a Weiss cover.

is exact. That is,  is a factorization algebra if it is a cosheaf with respect to the Weiss topology.

A factorization algebra is multiplicative if, in addition, for each pair of disjoint opens , the structure map

is an isomorphism.

Algebro-geometric formulation 
While this formulation is related to the one given above, the relation is not immediate.

Let  be a smooth complex curve. A factorization algebra on  consists of
 (Factorization) Functorial isomorphisms of quasicoherent sheaves

Example

Associative algebra 

To each open interval , assign . An arbitrary open is a disjoint union of countably many open intervals, and then set . Some care is needed for infinite tensor products, but for finitely many open intervals the picture is straightforward.

See also 
Vertex algebra

References 

Algebra